Marshall Dillon (22 July 1925 – 11 October 1979) was an Australian cricketer. He played three first-class cricket matches for Victoria between 1950 and 1952.

See also
 List of Victoria first-class cricketers

References

External links
 

1925 births
1979 deaths
Australian cricketers
Victoria cricketers
Sportspeople from Ballarat
Cricketers from Victoria (Australia)
Sportsmen from Victoria (Australia)